Mangelia pontyi is a species of sea snail, a marine gastropod mollusk in the family Mangeliidae.

Description
The length of the shell attains 7 mm, its diameter 2.5 mm.

Distribution
This marine species occurs off Cansado, Mauritania.

References

External links
 Dautzenberg P. (1910). Contribution à la faune malacologique de l'Afrique occidentale. Actes de la Société Linnénne de Bordeaux 44: 1–174 pl. 1–4 page(s): p. 29–30, pl. 1 fig. 14–16
 MNHN, Paris: holotype

pontyi
Gastropods described in 1910